Kim Ho-kon (also known as Kim Ho-gon, born 30 January 1971) is a South Korean former sailor, who specialized in the Laser class. Regarded as one of South Korea's most successful sailors in history, Kim has appeared in three editions of the Olympic Games (1996, 2000, and 2004) and has produced a tally of three medals (two golds and one bronze) in the Laser class at the Asian Games.

Kim made his Olympic debut in Atlanta 1996, finishing twenty-third overall in the inaugural Laser class with a satisfying net grade of 170. At the 2000 Summer Olympics in Sydney, Kim was not able to improve his previous Olympic feat with mediocre marks recorded throughout the eleven-race series, sitting him in the twenty-sixth position with 181 net points.

When South Korea hosted the 2002 Asian Games in Busan, Kim sailed powerfully in front of the home crowd to defend his gold medal from Bangkok four years earlier in the Laser class with a marvelous grade of 8.

Eight years after competing in his maiden Games, Kim qualified for his third South Korean team, as a 33-year-old, in the Laser class at the 2004 Summer Olympics in Athens. Building up to his Olympic selection, he placed thirty-ninth at the class-associated Worlds three months earlier in Bodrum, Turkey. Sitting almost at the rear end of the forty-two-man field with few marks lower than the top thirty recorded, Kim accumulated a net score of 255 points to finish the eleven-leg series in thirty-second overall.

References

External links
 
 
 

1971 births
Living people
South Korean male sailors (sport)
Olympic sailors of South Korea
Sailors at the 1996 Summer Olympics – Laser
Sailors at the 2000 Summer Olympics – Laser
Sailors at the 2004 Summer Olympics – Laser
Asian Games medalists in sailing
Asian Games gold medalists for South Korea
Asian Games bronze medalists for South Korea
Sailors at the 1998 Asian Games
Sailors at the 2002 Asian Games
Sailors at the 2006 Asian Games
Medalists at the 1998 Asian Games
Medalists at the 2002 Asian Games
Medalists at the 2006 Asian Games
Sportspeople from Daegu